The Pad (and How to Use It) is a 1966 comedy film directed by Brian G. Hutton. It was based on the one-act play The Private Ear by Peter Shaffer.

Plot
A sensitive man named Bob Handman (Brian Bedford), who lives alone in his apartment, encounters what he believes to be his ideal woman, Doreen (Julie Sommars), at a classical music concert. They arrange to meet at a later date at his pad. Because he is so unworldly, he asks his best friend Ted (James Farentino) along to the date as well for moral support. It transpires that she only went to the classical concert because she was given a free ticket by a co-worker. She has no interest in classical music, which is Bob's passion. But she is charmed by Ted who prepares the evening meal and flirts with her outrageously while Bob gets drunk.

Bob and Ted fall out and Doreen goes off with Ted. The movie ends with Bob sitting in a darkened room, listening to the aria from Madame Butterfly. He gets up and drags the phonograph needle across the record several times, placing the needle back on the record. As he sits in the dark crying  the record skips repeatedly over the scratched aria.

Cast
 Brian Bedford as Bob Handman 
 Julie Sommars as Doreen Marshall 
 James Farentino as Ted 
 Edy Williams as Lavinia
 Nick Navarro as Beatnik 
 Pearl Shear as Fat Woman
 Barbara London as Waitress
 Barbara Reid as Girl on the Phone  
 Roger Bacon as Larry
 Don Conreaux as Ralph

Production
Ross Hunter bought the film rights to the play The Public Eye in 1964. Originally Mike Nichols was meant to make his feature film debut as director with the movie.

In October 1965 Hunter announced he wanted to use unknown stars and director, and the writer Tom Ryan had not done a script before.

See also
List of American films of 1966

References

External links

1966 films
1966 comedy films
American comedy films
American films based on plays
Films based on plays by Peter Shaffer
Films directed by Brian G. Hutton
Films produced by Ross Hunter
Universal Pictures films
1960s English-language films
1960s American films